The 2012 Indy Lights season was the 27th season of the series and the eleventh sanctioned by IndyCar, acting as the primary support series for the IZOD IndyCar Series. It began March 24, 2012 in St. Petersburg.

The championship was dominated by the Sam Schmidt Motorsports team with French driver Tristan Vautier winning the championship by eight points ahead of experienced Argentine team mate Esteban Guerrieri. SSM drivers won seven out of the twelve races over the course of the season and Vautier also claimed the rookie of the year title. Colombian driver Gustavo Yacamán from Team Moore Racing finished a tight battle for third with countryman Sebastián Saavedra.

Team and driver chart
 All drivers will compete in Firestone Firehawk–shod Dallara chassis.

Schedule
IndyCar announced that all Firestone Indy Lights Series races would be broadcast on the NBC Sports Network in 2012.

Race results

Driver standings 

 Ties in points broken by number of wins, or best finishes.

Footnotes

References

Indy Lights seasons
Indy Lights
Indy Lights